Claduncaria rufochlaena is a species of moth of the family Tortricidae. It is found in Jamaica.

References

Archipini
Moths described in 2000
Moths of the Caribbean
Taxa named by Józef Razowski